China Grove Township is one of fourteen townships in Rowan County, North Carolina, United States. The township had a population of 23,348 according to the 2000 census.

Geographically, China Grove Township occupies  in southern Rowan County.  Incorporated municipalities here include the town of China Grove, Landis, and portions of the Cabarrus County city of Kannapolis.  The township's southern border is with Cabarrus County.

Townships in Rowan County, North Carolina
Townships in North Carolina